Shubha Mudgal (born 1 January 1959) is an Indian singer of Hindustani classical music. Her repertoire includes the genres of khyal, thumri, dadra, and Indian pop. She has received the Padma Shri in 2000.

Early life
Shubha was born in Allahabad into an academic family. Her parents, Skand Gupta and Jaya Gupta, were both professors of English literature at Allahabad University, and both of them had a deep interest in Hindustani classical music and kathak. Shubha's paternal grandfather, P. C. Gupta, had also been a professor at Allahabad University.

Education and musical training
Shubha grew up in Allahabad and after finishing school, attended St. Mary's Convent Inter College. As children, she and her sister were sent by their artistic-minded parents to a dance class to learn kathak. However, her interest in dance was never great and the fact that she attended a non-descript dance-class in the neighbourhood did not conduce to high levels of accomplishment. She once replied to a dance examiner's routine query of "Aap kis gharaane ki Kathak naachti hain? (what is the style/school of Kathak to which you belong?)" with the retort, "Hum apne gharaane ki Kathak naachte hain (I dance my own style of Kathak)". She later switched to Hindustani classical music as her vocation of choice while maintaining the same individualistic attitude. Her first traditional teacher (guru) was Ramashreya Jha in Allahabad.

After completing inter-college, Shubha moved to New Delhi and enrolled at Delhi University for her undergraduate studies. In Delhi, she continued her musical education under Vinay Chandra Maudgalya, who was the founder of Gandharva Mahavidyalaya, a school of fine arts located in Maudgalya's residence in Connaught Place. Apart from being an outstanding classical musician, Maudgalya was also an accomplished lyricist who wrote the song "Hind Desh ke Niwasi", used in the animation film Ek Anek Aur Ekta by Vijaya Mulay.

After graduating from Delhi University, Shubha continued her training under Vasant Thakar in Delhi, and more informally with other established singers as Jitendra Abhisheki, Naina Devi and Kumar Gandharva.

Performing career

Shubha Mudgal started performing as a Hindustani classical singer in the 1980s, and gained a certain reputation as a talented singer. In the 1990s, she started experimenting with other forms of music, including pop and fusion varieties. She says, "I believe in music. Khayal and Thumri are my favourites, but that does not mean that I should not experiment with other forms. Why should I curtail my musical urges? ..... I want to allow the artist in me to come through. If you are a musician, how can you say, 'this one is from devotional poetry, so I am not going to sing it."' In addition to her recordings and concerts, she briefly ran a website called raagsangeet.com aimed at lovers of Indian classical.

Mudgal sang the title track of Star Plus's serial Diya Aur Baati Hum along with Kailash Kher. She also sang on the soundtrack of the film Mystic India.

In 2019, she also turned into a fictional writer with her debut book titled 'Looking for Miss Sargam: Stories of Music and Misadventure'.

Awards
Mudgal's awards include:

 the 1996 National Film Award for Best Non-Feature Film Music Direction for "Amrit Beej"
 the 1998 Gold Plaque Award for Special Achievement in Music at the 34th Chicago International Film Festival for her music in the film Dance of the Wind
 the Padma Shri in 2000
 the 2016 Rajiv Gandhi National Sadbhavana Award for her outstanding contribution towards the promotion of communal harmony, peace and goodwill

Personal life
Shortly graduating from Delhi University, she married Mukul Mudgal, son of her guru Vinay Chandra Maudgalya. It is by this marriage that she acquired the surname Mudgal which she uses professionally. Her husband, who was also an accomplished musician, chose not to pursue music as a profession, but instead became a lawyer and jurist. He retired as the Chief Justice of the Punjab and Haryana High Court and thereafter headed the Mudgal Committee.

The Mudgals had one son together, namely Dhaval Mudgal, who is a lead singer in the Delhi-based band Half Step Down.

Shubha is now married to Dr. Aneesh Pradhan.

Discography
Albums
 Ali More Angana (1996)
 Classically Yours (1999) ISBN D4HV2718
 Ab Ke Sawan
 Pyar Ke Geet (1999)
 Mann Ki Manjeree
 Kisson Ki Chadar (2003)
 Shubh Deepavali (2005)
 Anand Mangal
 The Awakening (2006)
 Jahan-E-Khusrau (2007)
 No Stranger Here (2012)
Tamil songs
"Vaaraai En Thozhi" -  Arasiyal (1997)
"Thaiyya Thaiyya" - Uyire (1998)
"Five Star" - Five Star (2002)
"Kanaa Kaangiren" - Ananda Thandavam (2009)

References

Sources
 Maheshwari, Belu (4 February 2001). Shubha spreads magic, again!. Spectrum.
 Ghosh, Ritujay (27 July 2006). Shubha charmed by Sufi music. HindustanTimes.
  "Mythical India"

External links

 Official website
 
 Shubha Mudgal in Dance with the Wind
 Diwali 2008 Sunnyvale, US concert updates at UPANA

Indian women classical singers
1959 births
Living people
Hindustani singers
Musicians from Allahabad
Delhi University alumni
Indian women playback singers
Indian film score composers
Bollywood playback singers
Recipients of the Padma Shri in arts
20th-century Indian singers
Indian women pop singers
Women Hindustani musicians
Singers from Uttar Pradesh
20th-century Indian women singers
21st-century Indian women singers
21st-century Indian singers
Women musicians from Uttar Pradesh